Trimethylstibine is an organoantimony compound with the formula Sb(CH3)3. It is a colorless pyrophoric and toxic liquid. It is synthesized by treatment of antimony trichloride and methyl Grignard reagent. It is produced by anaerobic bacteria in antimony-rich soils. In contrast to trimethylphosphine, trimethylstibine is a weaker Lewis base.  It is used in the production of some III-V semiconductors.

References

Organoantimony compounds